The first series of Je suis une célébrité, sortez-moi de là !, the French version of I'm a Celebrity...Get Me Out of Here!, began on 14 April 2006 and ended on 28 April 2006. The programme ran for 14 days (16 days if counting the day the celebrities arrived and the morning the finalists exited). The series was won by Richard Virenque.

The program began well, having a peak viewership of 8.5 million when it premiered on 14 April 2006. However, by the end of the series the show had only a peak viewership of 7 million, which resulted in the show being discontinued for 13 years until its return in 2019.

Celebrities
The show began with 12 celebrity contestants.

Results and elimination

 Indicates that the celebrity was in the bottom
 Indicates that the celebrity was safe from elimination
 Indicates the winner celebrity
 Indicates the runner-up celebrity
 Indicates that the celebrity received the fewest votes
 Indicates that the celebrity was eliminated
 Indicates that the celebrity withdrew

Bushtucker Trials
The contestants take part in daily trials to earn food. The participants are chosen by the public (Day 1–8) and the production (Day 9–16).

Total amount of Bushtucker Trials the celebrities took part in:

References

External links

2006 French television seasons
France